Women & Songs 8 is the eighth regular album in the Women & Songs series.

Overview
The album was released on November 23, 2004.  The album is a special two-disc set that includes a special DVD containing 6 songs by extraordinary women, some of which were included on past Women & Songs compilations.  On the CD, 15 tracks are included, including new acquisitions by Sheryl Crow, Madonna, and Jann Arden.

Track listing

Music CD
 The First Cut Is the Deepest (Cat Stevens) [3:45]
(performed by Sheryl Crow)
 Stupid (Sarah McLachlan) [3:22]
(performed by Sarah McLachlan)
 Breathe (Brandon Armstrong/Andrew Dwiggins/Ryan Jordan/Douglas Randall/Marc Wanninger) [3:14]
(performed by Melissa Etheridge)
 Summer Sunshine (Andrea Corr/Caroline Corr/James Corr/Sharon Corr) [2:52]
(performed by The Corrs)
 Try (Gerald Eaton/Nelly Furtado/Brian West) [4:38]
(performed by Nelly Furtado)
 8th World Wonder (Kyle Jacobs/Joel Parkes/Shaun Shakel) [3:58]
(performed by Kimberley Locke)
 Helpless (Neil Young) [4:13]
(performed by k.d. lang)
 What Am I to You (Norah Jones) [3:28]
(performed by Norah Jones)
 Lucky Me (Sarah Slean) [3:18]
(performed by Sarah Slean)
 Love Profusion (Mirwais Ahmadzaï/Madonna) [3:38]
(performed by Madonna)
 If You Loved Me (Russell Broom/Jann Arden Richards) [3:49]
(performed by Jann Arden)
 Beauty (Antje Duvekot/Seamus Egan) [3:37]
(performed by Shaye)
 Paper Rain (C. Anderson/C.J. Ward/R. Wells) [3:46]
(performed by Amanda Stott)
 Take Me Home (Christine Evans) [3:27]
(performed by Christine Evans)
 Narrow Daylight (Elvis Costello/Diana Krall) [3:31]
(performed by Diana Krall)

Bonus DVD
 Constant Craving (k.d. lang/Ben Mink) [3:37]
(performed by k.d. lang)
 Black Velvet (David Tyson/Christopher William Ward) [4:49]
(performed by Alannah Myles)
 Kiss Me (Matt Slocum) [3:15]
(performed by Sixpence None the Richer)
 Carnival (Natalie Merchant) [4:30]
(performed by Natalie Merchant)
 Tonight and the Rest of My Life (Nina Gordon) [4:22]
(performed by Nina Gordon)
 No Man's Woman (Scott Cutler/Sinéad O'Connor/Anne Preven) [2:58]
(performed by Sinéad O'Connor)

Production credits
Mastering
Ted Carson

Photography
Jeri Heiden
Mark Seliger
Isabel Snyder

References
 [ Women & Songs 8 at AllMusic]

2004 compilation albums
2004 video albums
Music video compilation albums